This article provides details of international football games played by the Guinea national football team from 2020 to present.

Results

2020

2021

2022

References

2020–
2020s in Guinean sport